Lewistown is a borough in and the county seat of Mifflin County, Pennsylvania, United States. It is the principal city of the Lewistown, PA Micropolitan Statistical Area, which encompasses all of Mifflin County. The number of people living in the borough in 1900 was 4,451; in 1910, 8,166; in 1940, 13,017; and in 2000, 8,998. The population was 8,561 at the 2020 census. Of the four communities in the United States named "Lewistown", this borough is the largest.

History

Early history 
The borough was incorporated in 1795 and was named for William "Bill" Lewis, a Quaker and a member of the legislature, who was responsible for the designation of the borough, which was then known as the Village of Ohesson, as the county seat of Mifflin County.

During the late 19th century Mifflin County became the crossroads of the Commonwealth. Located near the geographic center of the state, the area became a hub for traffic moving in every direction.

Early roads crisscrossed the region, but it was the eventual construction of the Pennsylvania Canal and the railroads that followed that truly positioned Mifflin County as an economic force in the state.

Lewistown, as the major city in Mifflin County, saw its economy expand dramatically as entrepreneurs launched companies to construct canal boats or build inns offering lodging for travelers and workers.

At its zenith, Mifflin County was one of the busiest centers for cargo and passenger traffic in the United States. But with the demise of the canal system, Mifflin County eventually lost its place as a major transportation hub.

American Civil War 
On April 16, 1861, Lewistown sent its Logan Guards, a militia group originally formed in 1858, to Washington, D.C. for its defense. They were one of only five companies, all recruited in Pennsylvania, to share the honor of being the first U.S. troops sent to the capital. Monument Square, situated at the intersection of Main and Market Streets in Lewistown, serves as a memorial to these men.

Tropical Storm Agnes 
Lewistown lost its role as a major transportation hub, but still boasted a strong industrial economy until the early 1970s when the county's industries began a slow decline. Hurricane Agnes June 1972 crippled the local economy.

On June 19, Hurricane Agnes made initial landfall along the Florida Panhandle as a weak Category 1 Hurricane. Agnes then proceeded through Georgia, South Carolina and North Carolina before she moved back over the Atlantic off the North Carolina coast on June 21.

After regaining strength over the Atlantic, she made landfall again over southeastern New York on June 22 and moved westward in an arc over southern New York into north-central Pennsylvania. She became nearly stationary over Pennsylvania by morning of June 23, but was soon absorbed by a low-pressure system that slowly drifted northeastward from Pennsylvania into New York.

The soil, already well watered by spring rains, could not absorb so much water so quickly.

Most notably, the flood submerged much of the American Viscose Corporation plant, then a division of FMC Corporation. The facility, located on the banks of the Juniata River across from Lewistown proper, manufactured rayon fiber (primarily for rayon-belted automobile tires), polyester and Avistrap.

FMC was one of two major employers in the area at the time, the other being the Standard Steel Works. The "Viscose" plant was only marginally profitable before the storm and the cost to reopen was prohibitive. (Ironically, the demand for rayon fabric for trendy clothing shot upward only a few years later.) Rayon production, and with it, thousands of good-paying jobs, moved to another FMC plant in Front Royal, Virginia. The Lewistown polyester plant reopened, but it rehired only a fraction of the previous workforce. The site eventually became the Mifflin County Industrial Plaza and a variety of businesses have come and gone since then.

Economic downturn 
In the wake of the failure of Lewistown's industry, a long period of decline began. The 1990s saw the loss of several plants, including Masland and Lear, as well as Standard Steel filing for reorganization bankruptcy.  The early 2000s saw the loss of Scotty's Fashions, Mann Edge Tool, Overhead Door shuttering its sectional division, and Ford New Holland shuttering its Belleville plant which also led to the closing of the Belleville Foundry.

Present day 
In 2011, Standard Steel merged with Japanese company Sumitomo Industries and is now known as Nippon Steel; this merger effectively saved the jobs of 500 union laborers as well as many others in the area.  First Quality, an adult incontinence products manufacturer, opened a facility in Lewistown that employs approximately 400 people.  Geisinger purchased Lewistown Hospital in 2013 and expanded services including a helicopter pad, the Geisinger LIFE program and a new clinic in nearby Reedsville.

Today, Lewistown is seeing a boom in new small businesses by young entrepreneurs including restaurants and retail.  The construction of an enhanced highway system between Lewistown and State College was completed in 2020 and better connects the two communities.

Geography 
The town's borders lie along the Juniata River.

Climate

Water source 
The source of the borough's city water comes from the Laurel Creek Reservoir, which is located in Seven Mountains going towards State College.

Demographics 

As of the census of 2010, there were 8,338 people, 3,742 households, and 2,030 families residing in the borough. The population density was 4,138.7 people per square mile (1,598.0/km2). There were 4,345 housing units at an average density of 2,156.7 per square mile (832.7/km2). The racial makeup of the borough was 95.2% White, 1.5% Black or African American, 0.3% Native American, 0.3% Asian, 0.9% from other races, and 1.8% from two or more races. Hispanic or Latino of any race were 3.1% of the population.

There were 3,742 households, out of which 27.7% had children under the age of 18 living with them, 34.8% were married couples living together, 4.8% had a male householder with no wife present, 14.6% had a female householder with no husband present, and 45.8% were non-families. 39.3% of all households were made up of individuals, and 17.3% had someone living alone who was 65 years of age or older. The average household size was 2.21, and the average family size was 2.93.

In the borough, the population was spread out, with 23.3% under the age of 18, 8.6% from 18 to 24, 25.3% from 25 to 44, 26.6% from 45 to 64, and 16.2% who were 65 years of age or older. The median age was 40 years. For every 100 females, there were 89.5 males. For every 100 females age 18 and over, there were 85.3 males.

The median income for a household in the borough was $26,584, and the median income for a family was $38,356.  The per capita income for the borough was $16,447. About 22.8% of families and 27.4% of the population were below the poverty line, including 47.0% of those under age 18 and 13.6% of those age 65 or over.

Notable people 

 Jean Acker, actress
 Viola Alberti, actress
 Ralph Baker, professional American football player
 Carl Barger, attorney and baseball executive
 Frances McEwen Belford, "Mother of the Lincoln Highway"
 John Brown, member of the U.S. House of Representatives from Pennsylvania
 Joseph Campanella, actor
 Bob Cupp, golf course designer
 Kelly Harper, recording artist and singer-songwriter
 Joseph Henderson, member of the U.S. House of Representatives from Pennsylvania
 Laura Johns, suffragist, journalist
 Julia Kasdorf, poet
 John Lilley, U.S. Medal of Honor winner for gallantry during the American Civil War
 El McMeen, attorney and acoustic steel-string fingerstyle guitarist
 Carolyn Meyer, author of novels for children and young adults
 LeRoy Millette, senior justice of the Supreme Court of Virginia
 Jack Womer, decorated World War II veteran

Historical buildings in the Lewistown Borough 
The Embassy Theatre, McCoy House, Mifflin County Courthouse, Montgomery Ward Building, and Wollner Building are listed on the National Register of Historic Places.

Sports 
Lewistown has a passion for sports. Though geographically closer to the Maryland city of Baltimore, the residents are almost equally divided in supporting the Pennsylvania professional sports teams from Philadelphia and Pittsburgh. People of Lewistown also support youth sports. The Little League, Babe Ruth, and American Legion baseball teams grace the front pages of the local newspaper throughout the summer. And in the fall, the youth football programs spark rivalries between the smaller communities that surround Lewistown.

High school sports

Mifflin County Huskies 
As of June 2011, the Mifflin County School District voted to merge its two high schools, Lewistown Area High School and neighboring Indian Valley High School (itself a merger of Chief Logan and Kishacoquillas high schools) to form Mifflin County High School due to increasing costs, declining enrollment, and lack of revenues from the state level.  This is the second time the school district chose to create a single high school for the county.  The first attempt at a combined high school only lasted for three years in the 1970s before district officials broke up the school due to public pressure.  Mifflin County will compete at the PIAA District 6, Class AAAA level but compete in the Mid-Penn Conference due to a lack of AAAA schools in District 6.  The newly created school will bear the nickname of "Huskies" and sport purple, silver and black as its colors.

Lewistown Panthers 
From September 1976 to June 2011, Lewistown Area High School, nicknamed the Panthers, competed in PIAA District 6, at the Class AAA level. The Panthers won PIAA Championships in Baseball in 2002 and Girls’ Basketball in 1997 and 1998. In fact, in 1997 Lewistown Area High joined a very small list of Pennsylvania schools to have both their Girls’ and Boys’ basketball teams reach the state championship game in the same season.  The Lady Panther basketball was consistently ranked among the Top 10 teams in the state. Lewistown had an excellent wrestling program, with the 2006 squad finishing 8th in the state.

In the 2007 baseball season, the Panthers finished the regular season with a 9–9 record. The Panthers went on to win three straight district playoff games to earn the 2007 district championship while defeating cross town rival Indian Valley in the process. The team went on to lose in the state quarterfinals to eventual AAA State Champion Punxsutawny.

Old Iron Kettle 

The "Old Iron Kettle" is a black Kettle trophy that was awarded to the winner of the annual football game between Lewistown and its rival school Chief Logan until its closing in 1989 at which time the rivalry shifted to Indian Valley. Played for the final time on October 22, 2010, the game was won by Indian Valley for the fifth consecutive year. The schools subsequently merged to become the Mifflin County High School Huskies.

Other sports 

Auto racing, sprint car racing along with wrestling are popular as well as outdoor activities such as hunting and fishing.

Transportation 
 Lewistown (Amtrak station)
 Greyhound
 Fullington Trailways

Media

Newspapers 
 Lewistown Sentinel

Television stations 

 WHTM 27 Harrisburg (27.1 ABC, 27.2 ION, 27.3 GetTV, 27.4 Laff)
 WPMT 43 York (43.1 FOX, 43.2 AntennaTV)
 WHP 21 Harrisburg (21.1 CBS, 21.2 MyNetworkTV, 21.3 CW)
 WGAL 8 Lancaster (8.1 NBC, 8.2 MeTV)
 WJAC 6 Johnstown (6.1 NBC, 6.2 Charge!, 6.3 Comet, 6.4 CW)
 WTAJ 10 Altoona (10.1 CBS, 10.2 Escape, 10.3 Laff, 10.4 Grit)
 WHVL 29 State College (29.1 MyNetworkTV, 29.2 Buzzr)

Radio stations

Cable television 
Lewistown was one of the first three communities that formed the cable company later known as Cox Communications.

Education 
The Borough of Lewistown is served by the Mifflin County School District. It is also home to the only local Catholic Elementary school, Sacred Heart of Jesus , which educates children of any religion in grades K–5.

Lewistown is home to the Pennsylvania State Fire Academy, which is the only such facility in the state. Firefighting in Lewistown is very important, as volunteer firefighters have strong allegiance to the multiple independent fire companies in the borough to which they devote their time.

See also
Indian Valley High School (Pennsylvania)

References

External links 

 Borough of Lewistown official website
 PA Department of Environmental Protection Hurricane Agnes site
 

County seats in Pennsylvania
Populated places established in 1790
Boroughs in Mifflin County, Pennsylvania
1795 establishments in Pennsylvania